Tweed, an electoral district of the Legislative Assembly in the Australian state of New South Wales, has had two incarnations, the first from 1894 to 1904, the second from 1999 until the present.


Members

Election results

Elections in the 2010s

2019

2015

2011

Elections in the 2000s

2007

2003

Elections in the 1990s

1999

1904 - 1999

Elections in the 1900s

1901
This section is an excerpt from 1901 New South Wales state election § The Tweed

Elections in the 1890s

1898
This section is an excerpt from 1898 New South Wales colonial election § The Tweed

1895
This section is an excerpt from 1895 New South Wales colonial election § The Tweed

1894 by-election

1894

Notes

References

New South Wales state electoral results by district